Tugade is a Pangasinan-language surname. Notable people with the surname include:

 Arthur Tugade (born 1946), Filipino businessman and lawyer
 Lordy Tugade (born 1977), Filipino basketball player
 Regine Tugade (born 1998), Guamanian sprinter

Pangasinan-language surnames